The Citi Exhibition: Manga (or simply Manga, stylized as The Citi exhibition Manga マンガ''') was an exhibition housed at the British Museum from May 23 to August 26, 2019. It was the largest exhibition of manga (Japanese comics or graphic novels) ever held outside of Japan.

OverviewThe Citi Exhibition: Manga was organized by The National Art Center of Tokyo and the Organisation for the Promotion of Manga and Anime, and curated by the Sainsbury Institute for the Study of Japanese Arts and Cultures. It was held from May 23 to August 26, 2019 at the British Museum in London, England. The Citi Exhibition: Manga was the largest exhibition of manga ever held outside of Japan, and focused broadly on the history of manga, its artistic value, its social impact, and the manga production process. The exhibition itself was divided into six zones:

 A basic overview of manga, including editorial and production processes
 The history of manga from the Meiji era to the present
 Genres of manga, including sports, adventure, romance, science fiction, and boys' love
 The impact of manga on society, including Comiket and the World Cosplay Summit
 Original manga artwork
 Three-dimensional works based on manga, such as ceramics and sculptures

A central display of the exhibition was Shintomiza Kabuki Theatre Curtain (1880) by Kawanabe Kyosai; The Citi Exhibition: Manga was the final international exhibition of the piece, as it will no longer be loaned to museums outside of Japan due its age and fragility. Other major displays included original artwork by Akira Toriyama from his manga series Dragon Ball, in the first time the series' original artwork has been exhibited outside of Japan; a digital re-creation of Comic Takaoka, the first manga store in Japan; and the 12-minute silent documentary Manga: No Limits, Studio Ghibli in Close-Up, focused on the works of the anime studio Studio Ghibli.

An exhibition catalog was published in 2019 by Thames & Hudson in both English and Japanese.

ReceptionThe Citi Exhibition: Manga was the British Museum's most popular exhibition in 2019, and had the youngest audience on record for any paid exhibition at the museum.

In a review  for The Guardian, critic Jonathan Jones gave the exhibition 2 out of 5 stars, calling it "a tragicomic abandonment of a great museum's purpose," criticizing the juxtaposition of classic Japanese art with modern manga as inviting patrons "to seriously accept that manga’s big-eyed heroes [...] are themselves as worthy of attention as a work by Hokusai." In a responding review also published in The Guardian'', critic David Barnett wrote that manga "belongs in the British Museum as much as the Elgin Marbles", and commended the British Museum for having "rightly recognised [that manga] has contributed rather uniquely to modern culture over at least a hundred years, and continues to do so". In commentary for The Comics Grid, critic Salina Christmas wrote that they were "in awe" of the exhibition, and that they were "proud to see Asian culture enjoying this level of prominence at the British Museum.".

Notes

References

Further media

External links
 The Citi Exhibition: Manga at The British Museum official website

2019 in London
British Museum
Art exhibitions in London
Manga